Momigliano is a surname of Italian origin. Notable people with this surname include:

 Arnaldo Dante Momigliano, KBE (1908–1987), Italian historian
 Nicoletta Momigliano, FSA, Italian archaeologist specialising in Minoan Crete and its modern reception